Parliamentary elections were held in North Korea on 12 December 1972. Only one candidate was presented in each constituency, all of which were selected by the Workers' Party of Korea, although some ran under the banner of other parties or state organisations to give the illusion of democracy. Voter turnout was reported to be 100%, with 100% voting in favour of the candidates presented.

In the first session, between 25 and 28 December 1972, the SPA approved a new constitution, put into force a presidential system, with Kim Il-sung elected as president. Main topics were "The Adoptation of the Socialist Construction and of the Presidential System" and "Let Us Further Strengthen the Socialist System of Our Country".

The election were held synchronously with the elections to the provincial, city and county people's assemblies.

Significance of the number 216
Kim Il-sung's constituency number 216 was deliberately set to coincide with the birthday of his son Kim Jong-il, which was February 16th, and is considered as a sign of handing over Kim Il-sung's power to his son.

Results

References

External links
North Korean parliamentary election, 1972 at Inter-Parliamentary Union

Elections in North Korea
Parliamentary
North Korea
Supreme People's Assembly
Election and referendum articles with incomplete results